Gerald Knaus (born 1970) is an Austrian social scientist. He is a co-founder of the think tank European Stability Initiative (ESI).

Early life and education
Knaus was born in Bramberg am Wildkogel, Austria in 1970. He studied philosophy, political science and economics in Oxford, Brussels and Bologna.

Career

European Stability Initiative 
In 1999, Knaus co-founded the European Stability Initiative, a liberalist think tank, in Sarajevo. The organization has received funding from organizations linked to American billionaire George Soros. 

Today, the ESI has offices in Berlin, Brussels, and Vienna.

Policy 
Since 2015, Knaus has been an outspoken supporter of the migration policies of German Chancellor Angela Merkel. In 2019, he was appointed by Federal Minister for Economic Cooperation and Development Gerd Müller to serve on a commission in charge of drafting recommendations on how to address the causes of displacement and migration.

In 2020 he published the book "Welche Grenzen brauchen wir?" ("What Borders Do We Need?") on the future of asylum and migration policy.

Other activities
 Centre for Economic and Foreign Policy Studies (EDAM), Member of the Advisory Board
 European Council on Foreign Relations (ECFR), Member

References

1971 births
living people
austrian sociologists